Triachus is a genus of case-bearing leaf beetles in the family Chrysomelidae. There are about five described species in Triachus.

Species
These five species belong to the genus Triachus:
 Triachus atomus (Suffrian, 1852)
 Triachus cerinus J. L. LeConte, 1880
 Triachus peninsularis Schaeffer
 Triachus postremus J. L. LeConte, 1880
 Triachus vacuus J. L. LeConte, 1880

References

Further reading

 
 

Cryptocephalinae
Articles created by Qbugbot
Chrysomelidae genera